Red Zone is a term designating unsafe areas in Iraq after the 2003 invasion by the United States, Britain, and other allies. It is contrasted with the high-security sector of Baghdad called the Green Zone. Since the Green Zone is a very small area, "Red Zone" is applied to the rest of Baghdad. 

U.S. journalist Steven Vincent, who was murdered in Basra in August 2005, published a book titled In the Red Zone: A Journey into the Soul of Iraq; it was based on his blog by the same title.

References

Iraq War